Beat Hotel is the eighth studio album by Swedish pop music artist Mauro Scocco. It was released in 2003 through Scocco's own label Diesel Music.

Two singles were released from this album: "Han måste undra" (He's Got to Wonder), and "Fortfarande här" (Still Here).

Track listing
"En gång var jag kung" – 3:15
"Skyldig" – 3:52
"Sommar i Stockholm" – 3:43
"Den 11:e" – 3:51
"Han måste undra" – 5:15
"Säg ingenting" – 3:29
"Rullat med dom bästa" – 3:32
"Fortfarande här" – 4:19
"En sprucken vas" – 5:14
"Som ett träd i snön" – 3:59
"Lev nu" – 3:52

Charts

References

Mauro Scocco albums
2003 albums
Swedish-language albums